Catarina Juliana Camufal (born March 30, 1980) is a former Angolan basketball player. At the 2012 Summer Olympics, she competed for the Angola women's national basketball team in the women's event. She is 5 ft 6 inches tall.

References

External links
 

1980 births
Living people
Basketball players from Luanda
Angolan women's basketball players
Basketball players at the 2012 Summer Olympics
Olympic basketball players of Angola
C.D. Maculusso basketball players
G.D. Interclube women's basketball players
Point guards
African Games silver medalists for Angola
African Games medalists in basketball
Competitors at the 2007 All-Africa Games